The third season of The Challenge: All Stars premiered on Paramount+ on May 11, 2022. The season features twenty-five past cast members from the main series competing for $500,000.

Contestants

Format
All Stars 3 consists of a daily challenge, winner's selection and an elimination round. All contestants, with the exception of Nia, have made it to a final before.

Daily Challenge: Players individually compete in a main challenge. The last-place male and female are automatically sent to elimination. The three highest-placing male and female players form the "Authority" and are immune from elimination.
The Authority: Players in the Authority are awarded the power to collectively select a male and female player to compete in an elimination round against the last-place players.
Eliminations ("The Arena"): The last-place players from the daily challenge compete against the players selected by the Authority in an elimination round. The winners remain in the game while the losers are eliminated. 

From episode 5, the Authority would be reduced to only the first-place male and female of each challenge and the format changed. The Authority had to collectively select one male and one female to compete in the Arena. At the Arena, the selected players must then call-out an opponent of the same gender to compete against them. The winners remain in the game while the losers are eliminated. 

Twists
Sabotage: Implemented for the first six episodes, the first-place male and female from daily challenge are awarded the "Sabotage" in addition to being part of the Authority. They may use the Sabotage to penalize another player (or themselves) with a disadvantage for the following daily challenge.
Stars: Each player begins the game with one "Star". Upon winning an elimination round, players are awarded all the Stars their opponent currently possess. The more Stars a player has, the bigger an advantage they would receive later in the game. At the start of the Final Challenge, it was revealed that the player(s) with the most Stars would automatically receive five bonus points.

Gameplay

Challenge games
Tunnel Vision: Played in male and female rounds, players must look through small holes in a stone wall to view a 16-square pattern on the other side. They must then return to their board and replicate the pattern using tiles. The first player in each round to correctly replicate the pattern wins, with the next two players joining them in the Authority. The last players in each heat to replicate the pattern are automatically sent to the Arena.
Winners: Sylvia & Wes
Out of Reach: Played in male and female heats, players begin on a swing suspended above water. They must generate momentum and swing high enough to kick a key off a ledge into the water below. They must then retrieve the key, return to shore, and unlock a box of puzzle pieces before solving the puzzle. Players are automatically dropped and assigned a 20-minute penalty if they are unable to kick their key off after an extended period or are disqualified if they fall off the swing. The male and female with the fastest time wins, with the next two players with the fastest times joining them in the Authority. The male and female with the slowest times are automatically sent to the Arena.
Winners: Kendal & Yes
Playing Dirty: Played in male and female heats over three rounds. Each round, players must collect a ball from a mud-pit and bring it outside of the mud-pit to advance to the next round while the number of balls decrease each round. The first male and female to exit the mud-pit with a ball in the third round wins, with the other two players in each heat able to collect a ball during the same round joining them in the Authority. The male and female without a ball after the first round are automatically sent to the Arena.
Winners: Brad & Kailah
High Stakes: Played in male and female heats of three, players begin suspended on a ledge off the side of a 150-foot building and must solve a math equation. The first player in each heat to solve their equation may drop the other two players from their heat in any order. The male and female to solve their equations the fastest wins, with the four other heat winners joining them in the Authority. The male and female who are dropped the fastest, or refuse to participate, are automatically sent to the Arena.
Winners: Brad & Kailah
Side Tracked: Played in male and female heats, players begin with five pegs on their board. Throughout the challenge, they must run across a dirt track, collect a ring, and throw it onto an opponent's peg from behind a line. Players are eliminated from the challenge once they have one ring thrown on each of their pegs. The last player standing in each heat wins.
Winners: Mark & Sylvia
Stacked: Played in male and female heats of seven. Players must scrape paint off a board to reveal a four-digit code and use the code to unlock one of five available stand-up paddleboards. They must then paddle to a platform, collect a set of puzzle pieces, and assemble the vertical puzzle at one of three available puzzle stations. Players are eliminated from the challenge if they cannot claim a paddle board or puzzle station in time. The first player in each heat to assemble their puzzle wins.
Winners: Brad & KellyAnne
Shooting Stars: Played in male and female heats, players begin harnessed on a platform above water and are asked trivia questions one at a time. If they answer correctly, they can assign another player a strike, however answering incorrectly self-incurs a strike. Players are launched into the water and eliminated from the challenge once they receive three strikes. The last player standing in each heat wins.
Winners: Derrick & Veronica
Flight Pattern: Played two players at a time, players begin harnessed out the side of a helicopter as it flies over a lagoon. They must memorize a nine-square pattern seen from above, release themselves into the water and swim to their puzzle station before replicating the pattern. The male and female who correctly replicate the pattern, with the correct orientation, in the fastest time wins.
Winners: Jonna & Mark
Wall of Fame: Throughout the season, the house contained a wall with photos of this season’s contestants during a previous finale of The Challenge. Players must match the names of 24 contestants from this season to one of 24 questions about the photos. The order that players finish determines the teams for the first leg of the Final Challenge and the order they begin the leg.
Winners: Jonna & Wes

Arena games
Crawl Brawl: Players start at opposite ends of a narrow caged tunnel. They must transfer six sandbags through the tunnel and drag them to their respective bell. The first player to transfer all six sandbags wins.
Played by: Cynthia vs. Tina, Syrus vs. Tyler
Lights Out: Players begin tethered to opposite ends of a giant turnstile. The first player to reach a light switch and turn off a beam of light wins.
Played by: Laterrian vs. Mark
Weight Up: Players begin inside a cage and must throw weighted sandbags into an overhead crate to lower the crate and reveal a section of dry wall. They must then smash through the dry wall using a hammer, escape the cage and ring a bell outside. The first player to ring the bell wins.
Played by: MJ vs. Syrus
Steamroller: Players begin inside opposite sides of a cylindrical steel barrel. The first player to roll the barrel to their end of the platform wins.
Played by: Beth vs. Kendal, Darrell vs. Jordan
Knock Off: Players begin on suspended on opposite ledges of a wall 30-feet above ground. The first player to knock their opponent off their ledge, by pushing circular pegs through the wall to their opponent’s side, wins.
Played by: Beth vs. Jonna, Wes vs. Yes
Star Struck: Players must maneuver a pole through three star-shaped holes of a vertical maze to release the pole. Once released, they must use the pole to hit a ball through a small hole. The first player to hit their ball through the hole wins.
Played by: Derrick vs. MJ, Nia vs. Sylvia
Pull Your Own Weight: Players must pull a weighted bag up a vertical tower to release a set of puzzle pieces. Once released, the first player to solve the puzzle wins.
Played by: Jonna vs. Roni, Jordan vs. Mark
Light My Fire: Players begin at the center of the Arena with both hands on a metal pole. The first player to wrestle the pole from their opponent and ignite the pole at their cauldron at the boundary of the Arena wins.
Played by: Derrick vs. Nehemiah

Final Challenge
The remaining eight contestants were flown to San José Island for the Final Challenge.

Day One
Day One of the Final Challenge consists of two alternating portions: legs (racing from one checkpoint to the next) and checkpoints (competing in a head-to-head challenge against an opponent). During each leg, players race to the next checkpoint in male-female pairs. The first pair to reach each checkpoint receives 4 points each; second receives 3 points; third receives 2 points; fourth receives 1 point. At checkpoints, pairs are disbanded and players must select an opponent of the same gender to compete in the checkpoint against. The winner of each matchup receives 5 points while the loser receives none. The first, second, third and fourth-place players of each gender from the checkpoint are paired with the respective player of the opposite gender for the following leg.

Before commencing, it was announced that the players with the most Stars, Jonna and Nehemiah (5 stars each), would start the Final Challenge with 5 bonus points.
 First leg: Pairs race down a runway and collect a key before proceeding to the first checkpoint on a beach. For this leg only, teams are formed based on placements in the "Wall of Fame" challenge and depart in 30-second intervals in the same order.
 Checkpoint #1: Players use the key they collected to unlock wooden planks. They must use the planks to assemble a raft and paddle around a buoy before returning to shore. The first player in each matchup to return to shore wins.
 Second leg: Pairs race to a tandem bicycle and ride it through the jungle to the next checkpoint.
 Checkpoint #2: Players must run  to view and memorize an answer key consisting of four rows of nine colored stars. They must then return to their star sequence and determine which star in each row is different. The position of the different stars in each row forms the numbers to a four-digit code. The first player in each matchup to determine the code and use it to unlock a box wins.
 Third leg: Pairs race to a beach, enter a tandem kayak and paddle across the water to the next checkpoint.
 Checkpoint #3: Players begin on a floating platform. The first player to push their opponent off the platform and into the water in each matchup wins.
 Fourth leg: Pairs must transport 100 pounds of sandbags through the jungle to the next location.
 Overnight Stage: As a reward for progressing this far into the competition, it was announced players would spend the night sleeping on a yacht.

Day Two
The following morning, it was announced that only six players would continue Day Two of the Final Challenge. The two players of each gender with the most points from Day One would automatically advance while the remaining two players would compete against each other in an Instant Elimination for the final spot.
 Instant Elimination: Throughout the season, the house contained a map depicting the locations of each Final Challenge of The Challenge.  Players must fill out a crossword with the names of ten countries depicted on the map, with the specific locations (Acapulco, Bocas Del Toro, Los Angeles, Mendoza, Oslo, Phuket, Pucón, Reykjavík, Rio de Janeiro and Whistler) given as clues. The first players to complete the crossword wins while the losers are eliminated.
 Played by: Kailah vs. KellyAnne, Brad vs. Mark
 Eliminated: KellyAnne (fourth place), Mark (fourth place)
 Final leg: As individuals, players race through the jungle to the beach before finishing at the yacht from the Overnight Stage where a chest with the $500,000 is located. Along the way, they have to complete several challenges. At the first challenge, players must consume two pounds of various offal and insects before proceeding. At the second challenge, players must complete a pentagon-shaped puzzle before grabbing a surfboard and proceeding to the third challenge. At the third challenge, players must use wooden blocks to build a tower matching a given diagram. Once complete, players use their surfboard to paddle to the yacht offshore. The first player of each gender to reach the yacht are declared the winners of All Stars 3 and receive $250,000 each.
Winners: Jonna & Wes ($250,000 each)

Game summary

Episode progress

Competition
 The contestant won the Final Challenge
 The contestant did not win the Final Challenge
 The contestant did not finish the Final Challenge
 The contestant won the challenge was part of the Authority
 The contestant won the challenge and departed first in the First Leg of the Final Challenge 
 The contestant placed in the top three for the challenge and was part of the Authority
 The contestant was not selected for the Arena
 The contestant placed last in the daily challenge or was voted into the Arena, but did not have to compete 
 The contestant won the elimination in the Arena and received their opponent's Star(s)
 The contestant lost in the Arena and was eliminated
 The contestant withdrew from the competition
 The contestant was removed from the competition due to medical reasons

Final Challenge scoreboard
Players competed to earn points during Day One of the Final Challenge to determine who would automatically progress to Day Two. The points system was discontinued for Day Two.

Sabotages
From episodes 1-6, the winners of daily challenges are awarded with the "Sabotage" which allows them to penalize another player (or themselves) with a disadvantage for the next episode's challenge.

Episodes

Notes

References

2022 American television seasons
All Stars, The Challenge
Television shows set in Panama
Television shows filmed in Panama